In Greek mythology, the name Eurydamas  (Ancient Greek: Εὐρυδάμᾱς) may refer to:

Eurydamas, an Egyptian prince as one of the sons of King Aegyptus. His mother was a Phoenician woman and thus full brother of Agaptolemus, Cercetes, Aegius, Argius, Archelaus and Menemachus. In some accounts, he could be a son of Aegyptus either by Eurryroe, daughter of the river-god Nilus, or Isaie, daughter of King Agenor of Tyre. Eurydamas suffered the same fate as his other brothers, save Lynceus, when they were slain on their wedding night by their wives who obeyed the command of their father King Danaus of Libya. He married the Danaid Phartis, daughter of Danaus and an Ethiopian woman.
Eurydamas, one of the Argonauts, son of either of Ctimenus or Irus and Demonassa, if indeed in the latter case he is not being confounded with Eurytion who could also be his brother. Eurydamas was from Ctimene in Thessaly.
Eurydamas, son of Pelias (not the same as Pelias of Iolcus). He fought in the Trojan War and was one of those who hid in the Trojan Horse.
Eurydamas, an elder of Troy, interpreter of dreams. His sons Abas and Polyidus were killed by Diomedes.
Eurydamas, son-in-law of Antenor. Was killed by Diomedes.
Eurydamas, one of the suitors of Penelope, who gave her as a present a pair of earrings, and was eventually killed by Odysseus.

Notes

References 
 Apollodorus, The Library with an English Translation by Sir James George Frazer, F.B.A., F.R.S. in 2 Volumes, Cambridge, MA, Harvard University Press; London, William Heinemann Ltd. 1921. ISBN 0-674-99135-4. Online version at the Perseus Digital Library. Greek text available from the same website.
 Apollonius Rhodius, Argonautica translated by Robert Cooper Seaton (1853-1915), R. C. Loeb Classical Library Volume 001. London, William Heinemann Ltd, 1912. Online version at the Topos Text Project.
 Apollonius Rhodius, Argonautica. George W. Mooney. London. Longmans, Green. 1912. Greek text available at the Perseus Digital Library.
 Gaius Julius Hyginus, Fabulae from The Myths of Hyginus translated and edited by Mary Grant. University of Kansas Publications in Humanistic Studies. Online version at the Topos Text Project.
 Homer, The Iliad with an English Translation by A.T. Murray, Ph.D. in two volumes. Cambridge, MA., Harvard University Press; London, William Heinemann, Ltd. 1924. . Online version at the Perseus Digital Library.
 Homer, Homeri Opera in five volumes. Oxford, Oxford University Press. 1920. . Greek text available at the Perseus Digital Library.
 Homer, The Odyssey with an English Translation by A.T. Murray, Ph.D. in two volumes. Cambridge, MA., Harvard University Press; London, William Heinemann, Ltd. 1919. . Online version at the Perseus Digital Library. Greek text available from the same website.
 Quintus Smyrnaeus, The Fall of Troy translated by Way. A. S. Loeb Classical Library Volume 19. London: William Heinemann, 1913. Online version at theio.com
 Quintus Smyrnaeus, The Fall of Troy. Arthur S. Way. London: William Heinemann; New York: G.P. Putnam's Sons. 1913. Greek text available at the Perseus Digital Library.
 Tryphiodorus, Capture of Troy translated by Mair, A. W. Loeb Classical Library Volume 219. London: William Heinemann Ltd, 1928. Online version at theoi.com
 Tryphiodorus, Capture of Troy with an English Translation by A.W. Mair. London, William Heinemann, Ltd.; New York: G.P. Putnam's Sons. 1928. Greek text available at the Perseus Digital Library.

Sons of Aegyptus
Argonauts
Achaeans (Homer)
Trojans
Characters in the Odyssey
Phoenician characters in Greek mythology
Thessalian characters in Greek mythology
Characters in the Argonautica